Karl Scott (born May 2, 1985) is an American football coach for the Seattle Seahawks. He previously coached at the collegiate level at Alabama and Texas Tech.

Coaching career

Early coaching career 
Scott's coaching career began at Delta State as a graduate assistant in 2007. He then went on to work four years at Tusculum College serving as the team’s recruiting coordinator, defensive backs coach and linebackers coach. He then went on to coach at Southeastern Louisiana for three years, coaching the linebackers for the first two years and then serving as the defensive coordinator in 2014.  In 2015 Scott  coached the Louisiana Tech Bulldogs safeties  under head coach Skip Holtz.  For the next two years he oversaw the entire Red Raider secondary.

Alabama
Scott spent three years coaching at the University of Alabama under Nick Saban and defensive coordinator Pete Golding whom he had previously worked with at Southeastern and at Tusculum. Originally he was coaching both positions in the defensive backfield, but for the final two years of his tenure at Alabama he was only coaching corners. In 2020 he was a part of the Alabama undefeated national championship team.

Minnesota Vikings
For the 2021 season, the Minnesota Vikings replaced defensive backs coach Daronte Jones with Scott.

Seattle Seahawks 
On February 8, 2022, Scott has been hired by the Seattle Seahawks as the main Secondary Coach and Passing Game Coordinator.

Private life
Scott and his wife Taron have a daughter, Kina Bailey.

References 

1985 births
Living people
Louisiana Tech Bulldogs football coaches
African-American coaches of American football
African-American players of American football
Alabama Crimson Tide football coaches
McMurry University alumni
Minnesota Vikings coaches
People from Houston
Players of American football from Houston
Southeastern Louisiana Lions football coaches
Sportspeople from Houston
Texas Tech Red Raiders football coaches
21st-century African-American sportspeople
20th-century African-American people
Seattle Seahawks coaches